Bedtime Worries is a 1933 Our Gang short comedy film directed by Robert F. McGowan. It was the 124th (36th talking episode) Our Gang short released.

Plot
On the day he is promoted to head clerk (or "head cluck," as Spanky mistakenly puts it), Spanky's father (Emerson Treacy) declares that it is time Spanky stopped sleeping in his parents' room and go to bed in his own room. Earlier, the gang asked Spanky if they could board Pete, their dog. Spanky could not do that. During his first night alone, Spanky envisions all sorts of imaginary horrors, from a bat (actually a moth) to "the boogeyman."

Thus, when a burglar (Harry Bernard) climbs into Spanky's window, the boy's dozing parents fail to believe his story. Passing himself off as Santa Claus, the burglar attempts to steal everything that is not nailed down. The homeless gang stop at Spanky's house to stay. He tells them Santa was visiting and when Stymie sees him, he realizes that this man is a burglar. The gang comes to the rescue and tackle down the burglar and the police arrive and take the burglar away.

Production notes
With Bobby Hutchins, Dickie Moore and Dorothy DeBorba having departed after the previous film (Mush and Milk), Spanky is left to carry the next two films. New Our Gang members would not be introduced until 1934

Bedtime Worries was the first film since 1930 to employ only a minimal music score, relying more on dialogue than visual humor.

Cast

The Gang
 George McFarland as Spanky
 Matthew Beard as Stymie
 Tommy Bond as Tommy
 Jerry Tucker as Jerry
 Georgie Billings as Georgie
 Pete the Pup as Himself

Additional cast
 Emerson Treacy as Emerson, Spanky's father
 Gay Seabrook as Gay, Spanky's mother
 Harry Bernard as The burglar
 Billy Bletcher as Radio Voice (voice)
 Lee Phelps as Officer
 Frank Terry as Radio voice (voice)
 David Sharpe as Gay (double)

See also
 Our Gang filmography

References

External links

1933 films
American black-and-white films
Films directed by Robert F. McGowan
Hal Roach Studios short films
1933 comedy films
Our Gang films
1933 short films
1930s American films